Harry Houston "Bull" Alexander (9 June 1905 – 15 April 1993) was an Australian cricketer who played in one Test match, the fifth of the 1932-33 "bodyline series" against England at the Sydney Cricket Ground, as a fast, right-arm opening bowler.

He played for Victoria in 27 first-class matches between 1929 and 1933, and toured India with the unofficial Australian team in 1935-36. His best first-class figures were 7 for 95 for Victoria against New South Wales in the 1932-33 Sheffield Shield. He also played 89 matches for Essendon and 4 matches for North Melbourne in Melbourne local competition cricket between 1924–25 and 1936–37.

During the Second World War Alexander served as a warrant officer in the Australian Army from 1940 to 1945. He served in Malta, the Middle East and the Pacific.

Alexander later moved to Euroa in central Victoria, where he worked as a wool classer and became a municipal councillor. He oversaw the reconstruction of the local Memorial Oval to the precise dimensions of the Melbourne Cricket Ground. He was responsible for organising touring teams to play at the oval, including MCC touring teams during the 1950s and 1960s. He was also a past president of the Euroa Football Club. Social rooms at the Memorial Oval are named in his honour and he is listed in the Alexandra, Euroa & District Cricket Association Hall of Fame.

References

External links

1905 births
1993 deaths
Australia Test cricketers
Victoria cricketers
Australian cricketers
Cricketers from Melbourne
Australian Army personnel of World War II
Australian Army soldiers
Military personnel from Melbourne
People from Ascot Vale, Victoria